Muzaffargarh is a city in Punjab, Pakistan.

Muzaffargarh may also refer to:
Muzaffargarh District, a district of Punjab (Pakistan).
Muzaffargarh Tehsil, a tehsil of district Muzaffargarh.
Muzaffargarh railway station, a railway station in Pakistan.

See also
 Muzaffarabad (disambiguation)
 Muzaffarpur, in Bihar, India